Kyodo Public Relations or Kyodo PR is the largest independent public relations agency in Japan. It provide service mainly for enterprises. It was founded in 1964 by Sakae Ohashi and listed on stock market of JASDAQ in 2005.

In 2021, Kyodo PR was ranked 46th on the Global Top 250 PR Agency Ranking.

Location
Kyodo PR is located in Ginza, in the center of Tokyo.

References

Public relations companies
Companies based in Tokyo
Companies established in 1964